Patit Dommahal is a  village in the Patrasayer CD block in the Bishnupur subdivision of the Bankura district in the state of West Bengal, India.

Geography

Location

Note: The map alongside presents some of the notable locations in the subdivision. All places marked in the map are linked in the larger full screen map.

Demographics
According to the 2011 Census of India, Patit Dommahal had a total population of 3,971, of which 1,983 (50%) were males and 1,988 (50%) were females. There were 404 persons in the age range of 0–6 years. The total number of literate persons in Patit Dommahal was 2,372 (66.50% of the population over 6 years).

Education
Patit High School is a Bengali-medium coeducational institution established in 1955. It has facilities for teaching from class V to class XII. The school has 10 computers, a library with 2,300 books and a playground.

Patrasayer Mahavidyalaya was established in 2005 at Patrasayer

Culture
David J. McCutchion mentions the Sridhara temple of the Rakshit family as a low towered ''at-chala, having 12’2’’ square base, brick built with terracotta façade, constructed in the 19th century.

Patit picture gallery

Healthcare
Patrasayer Rural Hospital, with 30 beds at Hat Krishnanagar, is the major government medical facility in the Patrasayer CD block. There is a primary health centre at Balsi, with 10 beds.

References

External links

Villages in Bankura district